Brian Dabul and Marc López were the defending champions, but competed this year with different partners. Dabul teamed up with Jean-Julien Rojer and ended as runners-up, while López teamed up with David Marrero and lost in first round to Francesco Aldi and Simone Vagnozzi.

Mariano Hood and Eduardo Schwank won the title by defeating Brian Dabul and Jean-Julien Rojer 6–3, 6–3 in the final.

Seeds

Draw

Draw

References
 Main Draw (ATP)
 ITF tournament profile

Providencia
2008